Talitrida is an infraorder of amphipods in the subclass Senticaudata.

Families
The following are the families of Talitrida, organised by parvorder and superfamily.
 Talitridira
 Caspicoloidea Birstein, 1945
 Caspicolidae Birstein, 1945
 Kurioidea Barnard, 1964
 Kuriidae J.L. Barnard, 1964
 Tulearidae Ledoyer, 1979
 Talitroidea Rafinesque, 1815
Ceinidae J.L. Barnard, 1972
 Chiltoniidae J.L. Barnard, 1972
 Dogielinotidae Gurjanova, 1953
 Eophliantidae Sheard, 1936
 Hyalellidae Bulyčeva, 1957
 Hyalidae Bulyčeva, 1957
 Najnidae J.L. Barnard, 1972
 Phliantidae Stebbing, 1899
 Plioplateidae J.L. Barnard, 1978
 Talitridae Rafinesque, 1815
 Temnophliantidae Griffiths, 1975

References

Amphipoda
Arthropod infraorders